Nway Lal Nya Yae La Min is a 2019 Burmese drama television series. It aired on MRTV-4, from November 8 to December 13, 2019, on Mondays to Fridays at 19:00 for 26 episodes.

Cast
 Phone Shein Khant as Nway Oo
 Chue Lay as Soe Sandar
 Than Thar Nyi as Phoo Wai
 Hein Yatu as Kyaw Swar Moe
 Net Shine Ko as Aung Aung
 Khine Thazin Ngu Wah as younger sister of Aung Aung

References

Burmese television series
MRTV (TV network) original programming